Coopers School is a mixed secondary school with academy status in Chislehurst in the London Borough of Bromley, England. The current Head of School is Claire Bessa.

The school shares a site with the community special school Marjorie McClure. The site is on land between Chislehurst Common and the National Trust's Hawkwood Estate, an area of working farmland and woodland, and is above the Chislehurst Caves.

As of 2013 the school had some 1,357 students, of whom approximately 200 were in the sixth form.

The school was inspected by Ofsted in 2009 and rated good with outstanding capacity for sustained improvement.

History 
The school was first established in 1939 as the Sidcup Day Commercial School, with headmistress Miss Scorrer. After  World War II, in 1946, a second site linked to the Sidcup school was established at Hawkwood Lane, Chislehurst. The new school eventually became known as the Chislehurst and Sidcup Technical High School for Girls and in 1949 Mary Anderson was appointed head teacher.

By 1969 the Chislehurst site had been further developed, with several new buildings, and the two schools split. The Chislehurst school became Coopers School, named after the Coopers Mansion House which stood on the site. The house is still standing, and has recently been refurbished to become the school's sixth form centre. Later, in 1969 later school accepted its first intake of 37 boys.

In 1981 the school became an all-ability comprehensive school. The school became a specialist Technology College in 2002, and was renamed Coopers Technology College. In February 2012 the school converted to an academy. It subsequently renamed itself Coopers School.

Achievements
The school won a national award for ICT in 2006, for using computers to improve the way in which it is run. The school's website allows extensive interactive access to school information by staff, students, parents and governors through its learning gateway.

Notable alumni 
Tom Allen – comedian
Rob Beckett – comedian
John Loveday – physicist
Charlie Clements – actor
Michael Gunning - swimmer
Sam Matterface - sports presenter and commentator
Lewis Burton - tennis player
George Porter - footballer
JJ Hooper - footballer
Grant Bassey - footballer
Ade Azeez - footballer

References

External links 
Coopers School Website
Images of Coopers School on cityoflondon.gov.uk

Academies in the London Borough of Bromley
Educational institutions established in 1939
1939 establishments in England
Secondary schools in the London Borough of Bromley
Chislehurst